Altimeter Capital is an American investment firm based in Boston, Massachusetts and Menlo Park, California. The firm focuses on technology investments in both public and private markets globally.

Background 
In 2008, Brad Gerstner founded Altimeter Capital in Boston, Massachusetts. It was launched with less than $3 million from Gerstner's friends and family during the financial crisis of 2008. Prior to that, Gerstner worked at PAR Capital Management as well as General Catalyst.

A month after the launch of Altimeter Capital, an office was opened in Menlo Park, California.

In 2013, Altimeter Capital closed its first venture capital fund at $75 million.

In September 2020, Altimeter Growth Corp was listed on the Nasdaq (Ticker: AGC) raising $450 million. AGC is a SPAC which is a blank-check company. In April 2021 it was announced that AGC would merge with Singapore ridesharing company, Grab to help it list on Nasdaq under the ticker, GRAB.

In January 2021, a second SPAC, Altimeter Growth Corporation 2 was listed on New York Stock Exchange (Ticker: AGCB) raising $450 million. It was terminated early in December 2022 due to its inability to secure a suitable merger deal.

Business overview 
For public markets, Altimeter Capital manages a long / short public equity fund that invests in technology companies. The public equity fund is noted for its strong performance, averaging annual returns of 29.52% since 2011.

For private markets, Altimeter Capital manages private growth equity funds that invest in both early and later stage technology companies. Its first private fund was closed in 2013.

Public market investments

United Continental Holdings 
In January 2016, Altimeter Capital pressured United Continental Holdings to change its board of directors. Gerstner released a statement stating how investors were disappointed with the poor performance and decision making of the company in recent years. United Continental Holdings eventually gave in and changed its board of directors.

Meta Platforms 
In October 2022, Gerstner on behalf of Altimeter Capital wrote an open letter to Meta Platforms and its CEO, Mark Zuckerberg. In the letter, Gerstner criticized the company stating it had too many employees and was moving too slowly to retain investor confidence. He recommended reducing the headcount expense by 20% and limiting Metaverse investments to $5 billion per year. A few weeks later, Meta laid off over 11,000 employees.

Venture Capital funds

Notable venture capital investments 

 23andMe
 AppDynamics
 ByteDance
 Cazoo
 Epic Games
 Expedia
 FTX
 GitLab
 Grab
 HubSpot
 Julep
 Modern Treasury
 MongoDB
 Namely
 OfferUp
 Okta
 Pine Labs
 Plaid
 Priceline
 Roblox Corporation
 Snowflake
 SoFi
 StockX
 Twilio
 Uber
 UiPath
 Unity Technologies
 Vroom

References

External links
 www.altimeter.com (Company Website)
 www.altimetergrowth.com (Capital Markets Platform)

Financial services companies established in 2008
Financial services companies based in Massachusetts
Companies based in Boston
Companies based in Menlo Park, California
Hedge funds
Venture capital firms